|}
Philip Anthony Mitchell (born 17 April 1953) is a former Australian politician. He was the Country Liberal Party member for Millner in the Northern Territory Legislative Assembly from 1994 to 2001, when he was defeated by Matthew Bonson.

The Electorate of Millner was named after James Millner, the medical officer in Goyder's 1869 expedition to found the first colony at Port Darwin, who drowned in the SS Gothenburg tragedy.

References

1953 births
Living people
Members of the Northern Territory Legislative Assembly
Country Liberal Party members of the Northern Territory Legislative Assembly
21st-century Australian politicians